The following highways are numbered 751:

Canada

Costa Rica
 National Route 751

United States